Cymbiola mariaemma is a species of sea snail, a marine gastropod mollusk in the family Volutidae, the volutes. It was first described by John Edward Gray in 1858 under the name Scapha maria-emma and was named in honor of his wife, Maria Emma Gray, a fellow conchologist and algologist.

Description

Distribution

References

External links

Volutidae
Gastropods described in 1858
Taxa named by John Edward Gray